In medicine, any disease is classified asymptomatic if a patient tests as carrier for a disease or infection but experiences no symptoms. Whenever a medical condition fails to show noticeable symptoms after a diagnosis it might be considered asymptomatic.

Infections of this kind are usually called subclinical infections. Diseases such as mental illnesses or psychosomatic conditions are considered subclinical if they present some individual symptoms but not all those normally required for a clinical diagnosis. The term clinically silent is also found. Producing only a few, mild symptoms, disease is paucisymptomatic. Symptoms appearing later, after an asymptomatic incubation period, mean a pre-symptomatic period has existed.

Importance
Knowing that a condition is asymptomatic is important because:
 It may develop symptoms later and only then require treatment.
 It may resolve itself or become benign.
 It may be contagious, and the contribution of asymptomatic and pre-symptomatic infections to the transmission level of a disease helps set the required control measures to keep it from spreading.
 It is not required that a person undergo treatment. It does not cause later medical problems such as high blood pressure and hyperlipidaemia.
 Be alert to possible problems: asymptomatic hypothyroidism makes a person vulnerable to Wernicke–Korsakoff syndrome or beri-beri following intravenous glucose.
 For some conditions, treatment during the asymptomatic phase is vital. If one waits until symptoms develop, it is too late for survival or to prevent damage.

Mental health 
Subclinical or subthreshold conditions are those for which the full diagnostic criteria are not met and have not been met in the past, although symptoms are present. This can mean that symptoms are not severe enough to merit a diagnosis, or that symptoms are severe but do not meet the criteria of a condition. The DSM-5 has a range of subclinical diagnoses called "other specified" and "unspecified" disorders to fit this category, including Other specified feeding or eating disorder and other specified personality disorder and unspecified personality disorder.

Examples 
An example of an asymptomatic disease is cytomegalovirus (CMV) which is a member of the herpes virus family. "It is estimated that 1% of all newborns are infected with CMV, but the majority of infections are asymptomatic." (Knox, 1983; Kumar et al. 1984) In some diseases, the proportion of asymptomatic cases can be important. For example, in multiple sclerosis it is estimated that around 25% of the cases are asymptomatic, with these cases detected postmortem or just by coincidence (as incidental findings) while treating other diseases.

List
These are conditions for which there is a sufficient number of documented individuals that are asymptomatic that it is clinically noted. For a complete list of asymptomatic infections see subclinical infection.

 Balanitis xerotica obliterans
 Benign lymphoepithelial lesion
 Cardiac shunt
 Carotid artery dissection
 Carotid bruit
 Cavernous hemangioma
 Chloromas (Myeloid sarcoma)
 Cholera
 Chronic myelogenous leukemia
 Coeliac disease
 Coronary artery disease
 Coronavirus disease 2019
 Cowpox
 Diabetic retinopathy
 Essential fructosuria
 Flu or Influenza strains
 Folliculosebaceous cystic hamartoma
 Glioblastoma multiforme (occasionally)
 Glucocorticoid remediable aldosteronism
 Glucose-6-phosphate dehydrogenase deficiency
 Hepatitis
 Hereditary elliptocytosis
 Herpes
 Heterophoria
 Human coronaviruses (common cold germs)
 Hypertension (high blood pressure)
 Histidinemia
 HIV (AIDS)
 HPV
 Hyperaldosteronism
 hyperlipidaemia
 Hyperprolinemia type I
 Hypothyroidism
 Hypoxia (some cases)
 Idiopathic thrombocytopenic purpura
 Iridodialysis (when small)
 Lesch–Nyhan syndrome (female carriers)
 Levo-Transposition of the great arteries
 Measles
 Meckel's diverticulum
 Microvenular hemangioma
 Mitral valve prolapse
 Monkeypox
 Monoclonal B-cell lymphocytosis
 Myelolipoma
 Nonalcoholic fatty liver disease
 Optic disc pit
 Osteoporosis
 Pertussis (whooping cough)
 Pes cavus
 Poliomyelitis
 Polyorchidism
 Pre-eclampsia
 Prehypertension
 Protrusio acetabuli
 Pulmonary contusion
 Renal tubular acidosis
 Rubella
 Smallpox (extinct since the 1980s)
 Spermatocele
 Sphenoid wing meningioma
 Spider angioma
 Splenic infarction (though not typically)
 Subarachnoid hemorrhage
 Tonsillolith
 Tuberculosis
 Type II diabetes
 Typhus
 Vaginal intraepithelial neoplasia
 Varicella (chickenpox)
 Wilson's disease

Millions of women reported lack of symptoms during pregnancy until the point of childbirth or the beginning of labor; they didn't know they were pregnant. This phenomenon is known as cryptic pregnancies.

See also 
 Symptomatic
 Subclinical infection

References 

Medical terminology
Symptoms